The Asian Theatre Journal is an academic journal dedicated to the performing arts of Asia, focusing upon both traditional and modern theatrical forms. It contains descriptive and analytical articles, original plays and play translations, as well as reviews of books and plays and reports of current theatrical activities in Asia.

Background 
The journal was established by James R. Brandon (University of Hawaii) in 1984 and serves as the official journal of the Association for Asian Performance, an affiliate of the Association for Theatre in Higher Education. It is published by the University of Hawaii Press. In 1992, the editorship passed to Samuel L. Leiter (Brooklyn College), who began the practice of included a translated play in each issue. Kathy Foley (University of California, Santa Cruz) served as editor from 2005 to 2018. Siyuan Liu (University of British Columbia) is the current editor.

Asian Theatre Journal appears biannually in March and September. Its first electronic edition appeared in 2000 on Project MUSE. Back volumes up to three years behind the current volume are available in the JSTOR electronic archive.

Abstracting and indexing 
The journal is abstracted and indexed in:
 Scopus
 MLA - Modern Language Association Database
 International Bibliography of Theatre & Dance (IBTD)

External links 
 
 Asian Theatre Journal at Project MUSE

References 

English-language journals
University of Hawaiʻi Press academic journals
Asian studies journals
Publications established in 1984
Arts journals
1984 establishments in Hawaii